Tucket's Ride is the third novel in The Tucket Adventures by Gary Paulsen. It is set two years after Francis Tucket was abducted by the Pawnee and then saved by the Mountain Man Jason Grimes. Tucket is now trying to get to Oregon via Mexico and gets tangled with armies pursuing the Mexican War. It was published in 1997 by Delacorte Press.

It was later published as part of a five-part omnibus, entitled Tucket's Travels, along with the rest of the novels in The Tucket Adventures by Random House in 2003.

References
Gary Paulsen - Tucket's Ride

Novels by Gary Paulsen
1997 American novels
Western (genre) novels
Novels set in Mexico
Mexican War of Independence